Candelarialepis is an extinct genus of prehistoric ray-finned fish that lived during the Induan age of the Early Triassic epoch in what is now Nevada. It was described from the Candelaria Formation.

See also

 List of prehistoric bony fish
 Paleontology in Nevada

References

Parasemionotiformes
Early Triassic fish
Early Triassic animals of North America
Extinct animals of the United States
Prehistoric ray-finned fish genera